Gotvand County is in Khuzestan province, Iran. The capital of the county is the city of Gotvand. At the 2006 census, the county's population was 58,311 in 11,440 households. The following census in 2011 counted 64,951 people in 14,975 households. At the 2016 census, the county's population was 65,468 in 16,901 households.

Administrative divisions

The population history and structural changes of Gotvand County's administrative divisions over three consecutive censuses are shown in the following table. The latest census shows two districts, four rural districts, and five cities.

References

 

Counties of Khuzestan Province